Laudas Joly (August 6, 1887 – April 30, 1960) was a politician from Alberta, Canada. He served in the Legislative Assembly of Alberta from 1921 to 1930 as a member of the United Farmers of Alberta and from 1952 to 1955 as a member of the Social Credit Party.

Political career
Joly first ran for a seat to the Alberta Legislature as a United Farmers candidate in the 1921 general election.  He defeated incumbent Prosper-Edmond Lessard in the electoral district of St. Paul to pick up the seat for his party.  He was re-elected in the 1926 general election.

Joly was defeated in the 1930 general election by Liberal candidate Joseph Dechene by just 18 votes .  He ran again in the 1935 general election and was defeated by Social Credit candidate Joseph Beaudry.

Joly ran once again in the new electoral district of Bonnyville in the 1952 general election, this time as a Social Credit candidate.  He won the two-way race in a landslide.  He retired from the assembly at dissolution in 1955.

Electoral results

|-
!colspan=6|Second round

|-
|
|colspan=2|No second preference
|align=right|433

Second-round swing reflects increase in vote share from the first round. Overall swing is calculated from first preferences.

References

External links
Legislative Assembly of Alberta Members Listing

Alberta Social Credit Party MLAs
United Farmers of Alberta MLAs
1887 births
1960 deaths
Franco-Ontarian people
Franco-Albertan people